Michael Raymond-James (born Michael Weverstad; December 24, 1977) is an American actor. He is best known for playing René Lenier in the first season of the HBO series True Blood, Britt Pollack on the FX series Terriers, Neal Cassidy/Baelfire on the ABC series Once Upon a Time, and Mitch Longo on the CBS All Access series Tell Me a Story.

Life and career
Raymond-James was born in Detroit, Michigan, and graduated Clarkston High School in 1996, where he was a football and track standout. He started out doing theater and studied at the Lee Strasberg Theatre and Film Institute in New York, with George Loros, Geoffrey Horne and Robert Castle.  Following several stage appearances in New York, including The Petrified Forest at the Pantheon Theater, he relocated to Los Angeles.

He has guest starred in such series as CSI: Crime Scene Investigation, Medium, Boston Legal, ER and the season two premiere of Lie to Me.  He starred in the FX original series Terriers which was canceled by FX on December 6, 2010 after the first season. Raymond-James also played the role of Rene Lanier on the HBO original series True Blood.

In his feature debut Raymond-James played the best friend of Justin Timberlake's character in Black Snake Moan with Christina Ricci and Samuel Jackson. The actor also starred in Jonny Hirschbein's award-winning short film 'The Fix,' working alongside Robert Patrick and David Paymer. His feature-film credits include 'Moonlight Serenade,' starring as a piano prodigy opposite Academy Award Nominee Amy Adams.

In an episode of The Walking Dead titled "Nebraska", Raymond-James played a young man named Dave, who presents a threat to series protagonist Rick Grimes and his group.

He starred in Once Upon a Time as Neal Cassidy/Baelfire, who is Henry's father as well as Rumpelstiltskin's son and is later revealed to be the grandson of Peter Pan.

In 2020, Raymond-James was cast to play in the lead role of Gavin Wolcott in the NBC apocalyptic drama pilot La Brea which was written by David Appelbaum;  however, he left the project and was replaced by Eoin Macken. In the 2021-22 season he recurs on Law & Order: Organized Crime as Jon Kosta.

Filmography

Film

Television

References

External links

1977 births
American male film actors
American male television actors
Hollywood United players
Lee Strasberg Theatre and Film Institute alumni
Living people
21st-century American male actors
Male actors from Detroit
Association footballers not categorized by position
Association football players not categorized by nationality